Hey Romeo is a Canadian country music trio from Edmonton, Alberta. The band's members are Stacie Roper (vocals), Darren Gusnowsky (guitar) and Rob Shapiro (keyboard). Their 2007 single "Second Hand News", a cover of the 1977 Fleetwood Mac song, reached the Top 50 on the Radio & Records Canadian country-singles chart. Hey Romeo was named Top New Talent of the Year - Group or Duo at the 2008 Canadian Country Music Association awards.

Discography

Albums

Extended plays

Singles

Music videos

Awards and nominations

References

External links

Hey Romeo at CMT
Hey Romeo Facebook Fanpage 
Hey Romeo Twitter

Canadian country music groups
Musical groups established in 2002
Musical groups from Edmonton
Canadian Country Music Association Group or Duo of the Year winners
2002 establishments in Alberta